Coleonema is a genus of flowering plants in the family Rutaceae. The eight known species are all from the western Cape Province of South Africa. In Australia, where they are cultivated as garden ornamentals, they are often referred to as Diosma, a different genus in the same family.

Species
, the following species were accepted by Plants of the World Online:
Coleonema album (Thunb.) Bartl. & H.L.Wendl. – Cape may, white confetti bush, aasbossie, klipboegoe
Coleonema aspalathoides A.Juss. ex G.Don – confetti bush
Coleonema calycinum (Steud.) I.Williams – confetti bush, broom buchu, boegoe
Coleonema juniperinum Sond.
Coleonema nubigena Esterh.
Coleonema pulchellum I.Williams –  confetti bush, buchu
Coleonema pulchrum Hook.
Coleonema virgatum (Schltdl.) Eckl. & Zeyh.

References

Zanthoxyloideae
Zanthoxyloideae genera